Ashalatha Radhakrishnan is an Indian neurologist and a professor of neurology at the Sree Chitra Tirunal Institute for Medical Sciences and Technology. Her research on various neurological disorders have been documented by a number of articles. She has also contributed to several books, including Status Epilepticus: Practical Guidelines in Management, a handbook on Status epilepticus. She was the convener of workshop on epilepsy at the Monsoon Summit 2017 organized by the Kerala Association of Neurologists. The Department of Biotechnology of the Government of India awarded her the National Bioscience Award for Career Development, one of the highest Indian science awards, for her contributions to biosciences, in 2010.

Bibliography

Books

Chapters

Articles

References

External links 
 
 
 

N-BIOS Prize recipients
Indian medical writers
Living people
Medical doctors from Thiruvananthapuram
Year of birth missing (living people)
Indian neurologists
Indian medical researchers